Icupima ampliata is a species of beetle in the family Cerambycidae. It was described by Martins, Galileo and Tavakilian in 2008. It is known from French Guiana.

References

Hemilophini
Beetles described in 2008